José Carlos Rodríguez Hevia (born 1 April 1972) is a Spanish football manager. Since January 2022, he is in charge of the Training Methodology Area in the Project for Methodological Advice and Training for football clubs and coaches developed by the Government of the Atlántico and the Federación Colombiana de Fútbol (Colombian Football Federation) through the Liga de Fútbol del Atlántico (Atlantic Football League) in Colombia. He managed Kolkata-based club Mohammedan Sporting in I-League.

Career
Born in Gijón, Asturias, Bachelor in Psychology and UEFA PRO coach since 2003 Hevia started working with CD Santa Teresa's youth categories in 1990 before acquiring his coaching qualifications in 2002. Shortly after, he took over lower league sides Club Social Alcoa-Inespal, UD San Claudio, CD Manuel Rubio and AD Gigantes (Madrid), a club linked to Atlético de Madrid, with which he was promoted to the preferred youth category with the U19 team and with the senior team is on the verge of promotion to the first category of the Region of Madrid, before leaving for India in December 2014.

Shortly after arriving in the country, Hevia joined FC Pune City as their head of youth development and responsible for the scouting of the indian players of the I-League to play in the ISL team. He also took over the FC Pune City Reserves and Academy teams before leaving for Minerva Punjab FC to take over the youth categories. After becoming national champion with the under 18 team and defeating the Indian under 17 national team in their preparation for the World Cup that was held in 2017 in India, he was promoted to the coaching staff of the first team of I-League acting as head coach interim during the second round of the I-League championship improving considerably the performance of the team and obtaining good results that helped to the club to save the relegation zone.

In the 2017 summer, Hevia joined the joint venture Celtic FC Soccer Academy as their director of football, and later acted as an assistant manager. In 2019, he signs a new contract to come back to India to work as Shillong Lajong FC's technical director and head coach of the first team, with his contribution the club won the Shillong Premier League and the Meghalaya State League, because of the pandemic this fantastic sequence of success could not continue in the I-League championship.

On 25 October 2020, Hevia was appointed in charge of newly promoted I-League side Mohammedan SC.
In February 2021 Hevia was relieved from his position because of technical disagreements with the management of the club, leaving the team with only one defeat in seven games, leaving the team in fourth position at the time of his departure in the I-League championship.

In January 2022, he moved to Colombia to lead the Training Methodology Area in the Methodological Advice and Training Project for football clubs and coaches developed by the Government of the Atlántico and the Federación Colombiana de Fútbol (Colombian Football Federation) through the Liga de Fútbol del Atlántico (Atlantic Football League).

References

External links

1972 births
Living people
Sportspeople from Gijón
Spanish football managers
I-League managers
Spanish expatriate football managers
Spanish expatriate sportspeople in India
Expatriate football managers in India
Expatriate football managers in Bhutan
Mohammedan SC (Kolkata) managers